Çukurören may refer to the following places in Turkey:

 Çukurören, Bilecik
 Çukurören, Bolu
 Çukurören, Çamlıdere
 Çukurören, Çorum
 Çukurören, Gölpazarı
 Çukurören, Güdül
 Çukurören, Kızılcahamam
 Çukurören, Korgun
 Çukurören, Kozan
 Çukurören, Suluova
 Çukurören, Yığılca